The American Board of Psychiatry and Neurology, Inc. (ABPN) is a not-for-profit corporation that was founded in 1934 following conferences of committees appointed by the American Psychiatric Association, the American Neurological Association, and the then "Section on Nervous and Mental Diseases" of the American Medical Association. This action was taken as a method of identifying qualified specialists in psychiatry and neurology. The ABPN is one of 24 member boards of the American Board of Medical Specialties.


Organization
The Board of Directors consists of sixteen voting members. Elections to fill the places of members whose terms have expired take place annually. Neurology and psychiatry are always represented equally on the board. It is independently incorporated.

Certificates
In addition to the specialties of psychiatry, neurology, and neurology with a special qualification in child neurology, the ABPN (sometimes in collaboration with other member boards) has sought from the ABMS and gained approval for recognition of 15 sub-specialties, as listed below:

 addiction psychiatry
 brain injury medicine
 child and adolescent psychiatry
 clinical neurophysiology
 consultation-liaison psychiatry
 epilepsy
 forensic psychiatry
 geriatric psychiatry
 hospice and palliative medicine
 neurocritical care
 neurodevelopmental disabilities
 neuromuscular medicine
 pain medicine
 sleep medicine
 vascular neurology

References

Mental health organizations in Illinois
Neurology organizations
Medical associations based in the United States
Scientific organizations established in 1934
1934 establishments in the United States